The Mt. Surprise litter-skink (Lygisaurus absconditus) is a species of skink found in Queensland in Australia.

References

Lygisaurus
Reptiles described in 2005
Skinks of Australia
Endemic fauna of Australia
Taxa named by Jessica Worthington Wilmer
Taxobox binomials not recognized by IUCN